Andrei Yevgenyevich Purgin (born 26 January 1972) is a Ukrainian activist, cofounder of the Donetsk Republic organization along with Aleksandr Tsurkan and Oleg Frolov. Until 4 September 2015 he was the Chairman of the People's Council of the (disputed) Donetsk People's Republic.

Biography
Born in Donetsk on 26 January 1972. In 1989 he entered the Donetsk State Technical University. From the  early 1990s until the mid-2000s he held about 70 jobs, including trading companies, charitable organizations and the Donetsk circus.

On 23 February 2005 (Soviet Army and Navy Day) Purgin participated in a protest of the Union of the Born by Revolution that established a small tent city at the Lenin Square in Donetsk. The protested issued a request consisting of 12 principles that included federalization of Ukraine, official status for the Russian language and other issues promoting the rights of the Russian-speaking population. The Donetsk District Court of Voroshilov Region ordered the tents to be removed.

At the end of 2005 (6 December 2005) Purgin already headed the newly organized movement Donetsk Republic that claimed its heritage from the Soviet puppet state Donetsk–Krivoy Rog Soviet Republic. The organization claimed to fight the "orange plague" of President Viktor Yushchenko. It was marginal.

In the winter of 2013, together with "titushky", Purgin dispersed supporters of Euromaidan in Donetsk; but in the heat of battle titushky beat him.

According to the Ukrainian Ministry of Internal Affairs Purgin was arrested by the Security Service of Ukraine (SBU) on 19 March 2014, however, on 22 March 2014 he already was released. On 19 April 2014 Purgin was listed on the SBU wanted list for terrorism.

In the interview to "Informbyuro" on May 18, 2014, Purgin stated that on March 27, 1994, there was a referendum in Donetsk and Luhansk regions where 90% of population voted for federalization of Ukraine. He also acknowledged that the Donetsk Republic as organization included also National Bolsheviks mainly in Makiivka.

Purgin opposed some of the key points of the February 2015 Minsk II cease-fire agreement.

On 4 September 2015 Purgin was removed from the position of the Chairman of the People's Council of the unrecognized Donetsk People's Republic for "an attempt to disrupt a meeting of the People's Soviet and present false inflaming information". He was then detained for four days for reasons unknown to him. The new chairman of the Soviet became Denis Pushilin, his deputy. Pushilin denied Purgin's arrest. Observers claimed Purgin's dismissal was part of efforts of the Russian government to bring the Donetsk People's Republic to heel to observe the Minsk II agreement.

References

External links
 Aslamova, D. Vice-Premier of the Donetsk People's Republic Andrei Purgin: Ukraine placed a cross on the Donets basin. It does not need people here. "Komsomolskaya Pravda". 8 July 2014.

1972 births
Living people
Donetsk National Technical University alumni
Pro-Russian people of the 2014 pro-Russian unrest in Ukraine
Politicians from Donetsk
Russian nationalists
People of the Donetsk People's Republic
Pro-Russian people of the war in Donbas
Fugitives wanted by Ukraine
Individuals designated as terrorist by the government of Ukraine
Russian individuals subject to European Union sanctions
Ukrainian collaborators with Russia